Kim Roi-ha (born November 15, 1965) is a South Korean actor. Notable roles include a detective in Memories of Murder (2003), and a gangster in A Bittersweet Life (2005).

Kim won Best Actor at the 2001 Dong-A Theatre Awards for his portrayal of Yeonsangun of Joseon in the stage play Yi. He reprised the role in 2010.

Personal life
Kim married actress Park Yoon-kyung on September 10, 2006 at the Park Eul-bok Embroidery Museum in Ui-dong, Seoul.

Filmography

Film

Default (2018)
The Stone (2014) 
Monster (2014)
Doomsday Book (2012)
Hindsight (2011)
A Little Pond (2010) 
Where is Jung Seung-pil  (2009)
Dachimawa Lee (2008) 
Life Is Cool (2008) (cameo)
Radio Dayz (2008) 
Wide Awake (2007) 
Magang Hotel  (2007)
The Host (2006) 
Detective Mr. Gong  (2006) 
Forbidden Quest (2006) 
A Bittersweet Life (2005) 
Father and Son: The Story of Mencius (2004)
Memories of Murder (2003) 
Save the Green Planet! (2003) 
H (2002)
Yellow Flower (2002)
Jungle Juice (2002)
New Millenium Gymnastics (short film, 2001)
Barking Dogs Never Bite (2000)
Rainbow Trout (1999)
Soul Guardians (1998)
Whispering Corridors (1998) 
Incoherence (short film, 1994)
Baeksekin (White Man) (short film, 1994)

Television series
 Crime Puzzle (2021)
 The Road: Tragedy of One (2021)
Let Me Introduce Her (2018)
Whisper (2017)
Voice (2017)
Shine or Go Crazy (2015)
Inspiring Generation (2014)
The King's Daughter, Soo Baek-hyang (2013-2014)
Jeon Woo-chi (2012-2013)
Drama Special "The Great Dipper" (2012)
Lights and Shadows (2011-2012) 
Girl K (OCN, 2011)
The Princess' Man (2011)
Legend of the Patriots (2010)
Swallow the Sun (2009)
The Slingshot (2009)
Hometown of Legends "Demon's Story" (2008)
Iljimae (2008)
How to Meet a Perfect Neighbor (2007)
War of Money (2007)
Lovers (2006)
Special of My Life (2006)

Web series 
 Big Bet (2022) 
 Connect (2022)  
 Kingdom: Ashin of the North (2021)

Variety shows 
 Island Trio "Episode 8-11" (tvN, 2017)

Theater
Pumba (2013)
When the Sun Rises (2012)
A Story of Old Thieves (2011)
The Tenant (at Yoon Young-sun Festival, 2008)
Come and See Me (2003)
Yi (2001, 2010)

Awards
2001 Dong-A Theatre Awards: Best Actor (Yi)

References

External links 
  
 Kim Roi-ha at Hunus Creative 
 
 
 

South Korean male film actors
South Korean male television actors
South Korean male stage actors
Dankook University alumni
People from Gyeonggi Province
1965 births
Living people
20th-century South Korean male actors
21st-century South Korean male actors